Nicholson Township is the name of some places in the U.S. state of Pennsylvania:

Nicholson Township, Fayette County, Pennsylvania
Nicholson Township, Wyoming County, Pennsylvania

Pennsylvania township disambiguation pages